Nicolás Martínez (born 20 June 1984) is an Argentine professional footballer who plays as a defender for Fénix de Pilar.

Career
Martínez started his career in 2004 with Deportivo Morón of Primera B Metropolitana, remaining for five years whilst scoring two goals in eighty-two fixtures. 2009 saw the defender agree to join Acassuso, which was followed by a stint with Flandria a year later. On 1 August 2011, Martínez joined Argentine Primera División side Tigre. He failed to make a league appearance throughout 2011–12, but did featured four times in the club's run to the Copa Argentina quarter-finals; where they lost 2–1 to Deportivo Merlo, with Martínez netting their only goal. He was also on the bench for their 2012 Copa Sudamericana finals second leg loss to São Paulo.

In June 2013, having been selected for six Primera División fixtures in 2012–13 for Tigre, Martínez completed a move to Tristán Suárez. He scored his first goal in his third match for them versus Estudiantes on 29 September. Martínez left in June 2014, with spells subsequently arriving with Colegiales and Fénix in the following two years before he sealed a return to former club Deportivo Morón ahead of the 2016–17 Primera B Metropolitana; which they ended as champions, Martínez featured twenty-five times.

Personal life
Martínez is the brother of fellow footballer Román Martínez.

Career statistics
.

Honours
Deportivo Morón
Primera B Metropolitana: 2016–17

References

External links

1984 births
Living people
People from Morón Partido
Argentine footballers
Association football defenders
Primera B Metropolitana players
Argentine Primera División players
Primera Nacional players
Deportivo Morón footballers
Club Atlético Acassuso footballers
Flandria footballers
Club Atlético Tigre footballers
CSyD Tristán Suárez footballers
Club Atlético Colegiales (Argentina) players
Club Atlético Fénix players
Sportspeople from Buenos Aires Province